Soap Creek Township is a township in Davis County, Iowa, USA.  As of the 2000 census, its population was 610.

History
Soap Creek Township was organized in 1846. It took its name from Soap Creek.

Geography
Soap Creek Township covers an area of 34.9 square miles (90.38 square kilometers); of this, 0.05 square miles (0.13 square kilometers) or 0.14 percent is water. The stream of Bear Creek runs through this township.

Unincorporated towns
 Belknap
 Carbon
(This list is based on USGS data and may include former settlements.)

Adjacent townships
 Green Township, Wapello County (north)
 Keokuk Township, Wapello County (northeast)
 Lick Creek Township (east)
 Cleveland Township (southeast)
 Perry Township (southeast)
 Drakesville Township (south)
 Marion Township (west)
 Adams Township, Wapello County (northwest)

Cemeteries
The township contains eight cemeteries: Baer, Breeding, Harbour, Kingdom, Rime, Roland, Rudd and Sherman Chapel.

Major highways
 U.S. Route 63

References
 U.S. Board on Geographic Names (GNIS)
 United States Census Bureau cartographic boundary files

External links
 US-Counties.com
 City-Data.com

Townships in Davis County, Iowa
Townships in Iowa